Demba Kamara (born 4 May 2003) is a Sierra Leonean footballer who currently plays for Rimini.

Club career
Kamara signed for Serie D side Rimini in August 2021.

International career
He made his international debut for Sierra Leone in a 1–0 win over Liberia in March 2022.

Career statistics

Club

Notes

International

References

2003 births
Living people
Sportspeople from Freetown
Association football midfielders
Sierra Leonean footballers
Sierra Leone international footballers
Serie D players
A.S.D. Licata 1931 players
A.S.D. Giarre Calcio 1946 players
Rimini F.C. 1912 players
Sierra Leonean expatriate footballers
Sierra Leonean expatriate sportspeople in Italy
Expatriate footballers in Italy